Diego Rocha (born May 8, 2001) is an American soccer player who plays for Charlotte Independence in the USL League One.

Career

Youth 
Rocha spent a season with the Rio Grande Valley FC academy from 2019.

Professional 
On March 7, 2020, Rocha joined Rio Grande Valley FC's USL Championship roster. He made his professional debut on July 25, 2020, starting in a 1-0 loss to San Antonio FC.

On April 7, 2022, Rocha signed with USL League One club Charlotte Independence.

References

External links 
 

2001 births
Living people
American soccer players
Association football defenders
Charlotte Independence players
Rio Grande Valley FC Toros players
Soccer players from Texas
USL Championship players
USL League One players